Blockhouse Bay is a residential suburb in the south west of Auckland, in New Zealand's North Island. It is sited on the northern coast of the Manukau Harbour, and is also close to the administrative boundary that existed between Auckland City and Waitakere City, two of the former four cities of what was the Auckland conurbation before amalgamation into Auckland Council.

The suburb is located 11 kilometres to the southwest of the city centre, and is surrounded by the more central suburbs of Lynfield and New Windsor, and the Waitakere suburbs of New Lynn and Green Bay.

The Blockhouse Bay Library is located in the town centre, as is the Blockhouse Bay Community Centre, located 200 metres from the library.

History

Early history

Portage Road is the location of Te Tōanga Waka, one of the overland routes between the two harbours (and thus the Pacific Ocean and the Tasman Sea), where Māori would beach their waka (canoes) and drag them overland to the other coast, thus avoiding having to paddle around North Cape. This made the area of immense strategic importance in both pre-European times and during the early years of European occupation. 

The earliest European known to have trekked through, and followed the coastline of the Manukau Harbour in an endeavour to find if there was a waterway connecting the two harbours, was the Rev. Samuel Marsden in 1820. Two missionaries who had arrived in New Zealand on 30 December 1834, William Colenso and R. Wade, walked through the Whau South area in 1838 hoping to find a Māori settlement, but the Pa site on Te Whau point had been abandoned some time before. They remarked that the area was "open and barren heaths, dreary, sterile and wild." 

Te Whau Bay was used as a camping spot fur European settlers during the early colonial era of Auckland.

The Blockhouse

A wooden blockhouse was constructed over Te Whau Bay in 1860. At this time the first land war in Taranaki was escalating and there were fears it would spread north and so a defence system for Auckland was actioned. A 12-acre site was chosen, bordered by Esplanade (Endeavour Street), Gilfillan Street, Wynyard Road (Blockhouse Bay Road) and Boylan Street (Wade Street). The actual Whau Blockhouse was located on what is now No. 8 Gilfillan Street. 

The site was chosen for two reasons:
 The elevated cleared  site provided an unobstructed view towards the Manukau Heads, the source of possible attack from southern Māori tribes.
 It was close to the Whau Portage which was the route favoured by northern Māori tribes.

Colonel Thomas Mould of the Royal Engineers was charged with planning the location and type of defence system needed. A blockhouse is a purpose-built building with walls thick enough to stop musket ball penetration, with slits in the walls for defensive musket fire, a fence or stockade surrounding the building, with a trench beyond that. 

The blockhouse was manned by the 57th (West Middlesex) Regiment of Foot and the 65th (2nd Yorkshire, North Riding) Regiment of Foot until 1863. Never seeing military action, the blockhouse was rented out to a tenant in the 1880s and was gutted in a fire. It was subsequently demolished. The trenches were apparently still visible in the 1940s but have since been obscured.

Urban development

The earliest industry, in 1884, was the Gittos Tannery. The early 1900s saw other industries such as poultry, orchards, potteries, strawberries, flowers, loganberries and small farm holdings. 

A bach community at Blockhouse Bay developed in the early 1900s, with the area becoming a popular holiday resort for Aucklanders in the 1920s, with families making the journey over rough roads to spend the summer at the beach. During the Great Depression in the 1930s, workers developed the Blockhouse Bay beachfront area, building stone walls and pathways.

Demographics

Blockhouse Bay had a population of 15,747 at the 2018 New Zealand census, an increase of 1,377 people (9.6%) since the 2013 census, and an increase of 2,400 people (18.0%) since the 2006 census. There were 4,767 households, comprising 7,854 males and 7,893 females, giving a sex ratio of 1.0 males per female, with 2,850 people (18.1%) aged under 15 years, 3,525 (22.4%) aged 15 to 29, 7,023 (44.6%) aged 30 to 64, and 2,349 (14.9%) aged 65 or older.

Ethnicities were 34.8% European/Pākehā, 6.6% Māori, 13.2% Pacific peoples, 50.8% Asian, and 4.1% other ethnicities. People may identify with more than one ethnicity.

The percentage of people born overseas was 52.1, compared with 27.1% nationally.

Although some people chose not to answer the census's question about religious affiliation, 33.0% had no religion, 35.1% were Christian, 0.3% had Māori religious beliefs, 14.4% were Hindu, 8.1% were Muslim, 1.9% were Buddhist and 2.6% had other religions.

Of those at least 15 years old, 3,852 (29.9%) people had a bachelor's or higher degree, and 1,788 (13.9%) people had no formal qualifications. 1,887 people (14.6%) earned over $70,000 compared to 17.2% nationally. The employment status of those at least 15 was that 6,135 (47.6%) people were employed full-time, 1,650 (12.8%) were part-time, and 537 (4.2%) were unemployed.

Education 
The school was established in 1959.

The school was founded in 2003.

All these schools are coeducational. Rolls are as of  

Local state or state-integrated secondary schools are Lynfield College, Mount Roskill Grammar School, Green Bay High School, and Marcellin College .

Sport and recreation
The Bay Roskill Vikings rugby league club are based at Blockhouse Bay reserve.

References 

"Why Blockhouse Bay?" Compiled by Keith G. Rusden for the Blockhouse Bay Historical Society Inc.

External links
 Blockhouse Bay Historical Society Inc.
 Photographs of Blockhouse Bay held in Auckland Libraries' heritage collections.

Suburbs of Auckland
Populated places around the Manukau Harbour
Bays of the Auckland Region
Whau Local Board Area
West Auckland, New Zealand